The Roland JP-8000 is an analog modeling synthesizer released by the Roland Corporation in 1996.

Overview 
The Roland JP-8000 was released in early 1997 as part of the first wave of virtual analog modeling synthesizers (VA synths). Others from that period included the Clavia Nord Lead (1995), Korg Prophecy (1995), Access Virus (1997) and Yamaha AN1x (1997).  VA synths had the goal of recreating the sound, functionality and user interface of classic analog synthesizers. The JP-8000 was viewed at the time as the modern digital incarnation of the classic Roland Jupiter-8, from 1981. The programming interface,  synthesis options and general tone is very similar to Roland's Jupiter-6 as well. The JP-8000 sought to digitally reproduce the warm analog tonalities and sheer power of its analog predecessors. Although it lacked somewhat in analog warmth due to its early digital architecture, it added many new features, such as RPS (Realtime Phrase Sequencing), which allowed short sequenced phrases to be assigned to keys, and such as motion control.  It also featured the unique Supersaw oscillators and analog-style controllers such as an arpeggiator and an assignable touch response ribbon control.

The JP-8000 had several features that differed from other analog modeling synthesizers of the time. Most notably, Roland's unique oscillator types ("Feedback" and "Supersaw") and the use of sliders instead of rotary encoders (knobs) to edit patch parameters. The Supersaw in particular was the reason why the JP-8000 was particularly successful as a main keyboard (along with the Virus) in the dance music market, especially for trance music.  Just like what the Roland TB-303 had done for acid house and acid techno, the JP-8000's Supersaw leads became characteristic of a certain type of trance music that can be roughly called "Anthem Trance", where a melodic, powerful lead based on a Supersaw patch provided the hook and melody throughout the song. The sound processor is 16 bit.

In 1998, Roland released a 6U, 19" rack version of JP-8000 called the JP-8080. The JP-8080 combined the analog modeling sound engine of the JP-8000 with additional features such as an internal vocoder.  The JP-8080 also had three times the number of patches and performances, an additional Noise waveform on Osc 2 and a distortion effect. Due to these changes all JP-8000 patches are compatible with the JP-8080 but not all JP-8080 patches are compatible with the JP-8000. In popular usage however the two synthesizers are usually thought of as identical in regard to sound architecture (often referred to collectively as JP-80x0).

The JP-8080 is prominent on the Darude single Sandstorm. The song is named for the pad patch loaded on boot up of JP-8080.

Supersaw

The supersaw is a waveform created by Roland for their JP-8000 and JP-8080 line of analog modeling synthesizers. It emulates the sound of multiple detuned sawtooth oscillators. The waveform is described as a free-run oscillator whose shape resembles 7 sawtooth oscillators detuned against each other over a period of time.

Since production of the JP-8000 ceased, several companies have incorporated "supersaw-like" oscillator algorithms into their hardware and software synthesizers. SUPERWAVE P8 is an example of a software synthesizer inspired by the architecture of the JP-8000, with its multiple sawtooth oscillators. Another is the Supersaw Plus, which has a JP-8000-style interface and a variation on the supersaw waveform that provides 2, 4, 6 or 10 oscillators. In 2005, Access Music released the TI-line of synthesizers, which feature an oscillator type called Hypersaw that is similar to Roland's supersaw oscillator. Roland also continues to produce other synthesizers, such as the SH-201, the SH-01, the Roland V-Synth, and the Roland V-Synth XT that have the supersaw oscillator type. The supersaw gained popularity in electronic dance music, especially with its use in hardcore, trance and future bass music.

References

Notes

Further reading

External links
 Roland JP-8000 at Vintagesynth.com
 Roland JP-8000 JP8000 user comments at Dancetech.com
 Roland JP8000 Sound On Sound preview (February 1997) (archive.org)
 Roland JP8000 Sound On Sound review by Paul Ward (March 1997) (archive.org)
 Sweetwater.com - New Roland Products (Spring 1997) (archive.org)

JP-8000
Virtual analog synthesizers
Polyphonic synthesizers
Digital synthesizers